is a Japanese former Grand Prix motorcycle road racer. He was the 1993 FIM 250cc World Champion.

Early years 
Born in Chiba, Japan, Harada won the Japanese 125cc Junior championship in 1988, and was runner-up to Tadayuki Okada in the All-Japan 250cc series in both 1990 and 1991, before taking the crown in 1992. In all three years he competed in the Japanese round of the 250cc World Championship, twice starting on the front row and twice scoring points. His performance earned him a sponsored ride in the 1993 250cc World Championship.

250 career 
Riding a Yamaha TZ250, he won four races including his home race and won the 1993 250cc World Championship in his first attempt defeating Honda's Loris Capirossi. A wrist injury affected his performance in the 1994 season, finishing 7th overall with only a single podium finish. In 1995 Harada was Max Biaggi's main competitor for the 250 title. He won one race and finished 2nd eight times. In 1996 his bike was underpowered and he only reached the podium four times. He was on the verge of retiring when Aprilia offered him a bike for the 1997 season. Although his 235 points were the most he scored in a season, he finished the season in third place behind Biaggi and Ralf Waldmann.

In 1998 Harada battled his Aprilia teammate Capirossi for the championship, leading for most of the season, until the two riders were involved in a controversial incident at the final race of the year in Argentina. Harada had the world championship within sight, leading the race into the final corner of the final lap when Harada's bike was rammed from behind by Capirossi's machine, sending the Japanese rider off the track. Valentino Rossi took the victory while Capirossi claimed second place and the world championship. Harada would finish the season in third place behind Capirossi and Rossi.

500 career 
In 1999 Harada moved up to the 500cc class to compete on Aprilia's 380cc V-twin race bike. He obtained top 5 finishes in the first 10 races, including podium results at Paul Ricard and Donington Park: however, the bike's performance subsequently faded and he could not improve his results. In 2000 he was less competitive, coming 16th overall. In 2001 he made another attempt to obtain a second 250cc world championship, taking 8 poles and three victories: the title, however, went to fellow Japanese Daijiro Kato. For 2002 he entered the MotoGP class aboard a Honda two-stroke, but this proved to be his final year of professional racing, as he retired after a difficult season that saw him finish 17th overall. He ended his career with 17 Grand Prix victories, all in the 250cc class.

Grand Prix career statistics 
Points system from 1988 to 1992:

Points system from 1993:

(key) (Races in bold indicate pole position; races in italics indicate fastest lap)

References

External links

Profile
 Official site

People from Chiba (city)
Japanese motorcycle racers
Pramac Racing MotoGP riders
500cc World Championship riders
250cc World Championship riders
1970 births
Living people
MotoGP World Championship riders
250cc World Riders' Champions